Manjeshwar is a town and a minor port in Kasaragod district  at the northern tip  of Kerala. It is a coastal town in Kasaragod district.

Demographics
The Manjeshwar Census Town (CT) has an area of 3.98 km² with population of 8,742 of which 4,178 are males while 4,564 are females as per report released by Census India 2011.

The Population of Children with age of 0-6 is 1149 which is 13.14% of the total population of Manjeshwar (CT). In Manjeshwar Census Town, the Female Sex Ratio is of 1092 against the state average of 1084. Moreover, the Child Sex Ratio in Manjeshwar is around 995 compared to the Kerala state average of 964. Literacy rate of Manjeshwar city is 92.91%, which is lower than the state average of 94.00%. In Manjeshwar, male literacy is around 97.53% while female literacy is 88.75%.

Religions
As per 2011 census report, Manjeshwar census town had total population of 8,742 among which 5,827 are Muslims (66.7%), 2,742 are Hindus (31.4%), 165 are Christians (1.9%), 28 people  not stated their religion (0.3%) and 4 marked under others category.

Education
 Govt. High School, Bangra Manjeshwar
 Govinda Pai College, Manjeshwar

Health
Manjeshwar is one of the areas with large number of HIV patients. 970 HIV cases were registered in Kasaragod district.  Ten HIV deaths were reported from Kasaragod district within a short period of two months in 2016. There is no special facility or doctors for HIV patients in this area.  HIV affected areas in Kasaragod include Dharmathadka, Nileshwaram, Manjeshwar, Bandiyod, Vellarikundu, Kasaragod town and Padannakkad.

See also
 Mangalore
 Uppala
 Kaliyoor, Kasaragod
 Kanwatheertha Beach Resort
 Kasaragod
 Kunjathur
 Manjeshwar railway station
 Badaje

References

External links

Birds eye view maps of Manjeshwar. (Courtesy: Wikimapia)

Cities and towns in Kasaragod district
Manjeshwar area